The Dublin School is an independent college-preparatory school with a student body of 169. It has grown from approximately 110 students in 2008. It is located in the United States in Dublin, New Hampshire, near Dublin Pond and Mount Monadnock. Of the 169 enrolled, approximately 70% are boarding students.

History
Paul Lehmann founded the school in 1935, after an extensive search for a high-elevation, lakeside location in southern New Hampshire. In the school's first year there were eight students and six faculty. Since 1935, the school has worked to provide students with a broad-based college preparatory education emphasizing community values and individual responsibility. All programs and endeavors seek to foster communal and individual responsibilities.

In 1983, Dublin began to host The Walden School, a summer music school.

Bradford Bates is the current Head of School at Dublin School.

Academics
Courses include chemistry, biology, marine biology, algebra, pre-calculus, calculus, statistics,  Spanish,  world history, American history, economics and English, thirteen AP courses, and various electives in each category. When unable to find a desired course, students may start an "independent study".

In order to graduate, a student needs 3 years of high school math including Algebra II, 3 years of high school science including Biology and Chemistry, two years of high school language in the same language, two years of arts, and two trimester elective courses including Technology and Design.

Dublin School also provides various extra-curricular activities including musicals, drama, orchestra, and the other performing arts.

Campus
Dublin has seven dormitories: Monadnock House, Slopeside, Corner House, Lehmann, Hoyt-Horner, Wing and Hollow, and New Dorm. Slopeside was completed during the 2017-18 school year to replace the aging Hill House Dormitory.

In addition to traditional classrooms, specialized facilities include the Fountain Arts Building with state of the art sound and light equipment and an outdoor performance space for spring concerts; Gillespie Hall, home to the Putnam Gallery, Spencer Student Center, and the Christopher R. Horgan Art Studio with dedicated space for advanced art portfolio students, and a high-tech computer lab for digital photography and filmmaking; the Perkin Observatory; a robotics labs and maker space; a music and recording studio; the Griffin Learning Center; and a Writers' Cottage.

Extra-curricular
Dublin School supports athletics teams in alpine skiing (co-ed), basketball (boys and girls teams), crew (boys and girls teams), cross country running (co-ed), Nordic skiing (co-ed), equestrian (co-ed), lacrosse (boys and girls teams), mountain biking (boys and girls divisions), sailing (co-ed), varsity soccer (boys and girls teams), snowboarding (co-ed),  tennis (boys and girls teams), and ultimate frisbee (co-ed). The school has also entered teams into the Reach the Beach Race in NH since 2011.

Other extracurricular and co-curricular activities include dance, musicals, plays, jazz ensemble, Dubliners (choral ensemble), art portfolio, and various other Fine and Performing Arts activities.

References

External links
Dublin School website

Co-educational boarding schools
Educational institutions established in 1935
Private high schools in New Hampshire
Preparatory schools in New Hampshire
Schools in Cheshire County, New Hampshire
1935 establishments in New Hampshire
Boarding schools in New Hampshire
Buildings and structures in Dublin, New Hampshire